Suffolk University College of Arts and Sciences is the undergraduate and graduate division of Suffolk University in Boston, Massachusetts. Suffolk was founded in 1906 and the College of Arts and Sciences was founded in 1934 by Gleason Leonard Archer. The College confers Bachelor of Arts (B.A.) or Bachelor of Science (B.S.), Bachelor of Fine Arts (B.F.A.), Master of Arts (M.A.), Master of Education (M.Ed.), Master of Science (M.S.), and Doctor of Philosophy (Ph.D.) degrees and several others.

Academics
The Suffolk College of Arts and Sciences has seventeen academic departments which offer more than seventy undergraduate and graduate programs, ranging from engineering and biology to theater to art and design and economics. The school has honors program for qualified candidates. The university also offers various opportunities at its research institutes, including: Beacon Hill Institute, Center for Crime & Justice Policy Research, Center for Restorative Justice, Center for Women's Health and Human Right, Poetry Center, and Political Research Center, R.S. Friedman Field Station, and Sagan Energy Research Laboratory. The New England School of Art and Design, founded in 1923, has been a department of the college since merging in 1996.

In 2011 U.S. News ranked Suffolk #60 in Regional Universities (North). In 2009 U.S. News ranked Suffolk in the "top tier of "Best Master's Universities" in the North" and #7 in "Best College: Most International Students" attending master's programs." Suffolk is also listed annually in the Princeton Review rankings of "The Best 376 Colleges", including a ranking in the top 25 entrepreneurship programs in the United States.

Athletics and student organizations
12 athletic teams from Suffolk compete in the NCAA Division III. Suffolk is a member of the NCAA National Collegiate Athletic Association, ECAC– Eastern College Athletic Conference, and GNAC– Great Northeast Athletic Conference. The university is located nearby the TD Banknorth Garden, home to the Boston Celtics and Bruins.  The Ridgeway Building on Cambridge Street contains the university's Reagan Gymnasium and fitness facility.. The student organizations on campus are:

American Chemical Society (ACS)
Asian American Association (AAA)
Best Buddies                       
Beta Beta Beta (Tri-Beta)
Black Student Union (BSU)
Cape Verdean Student Association (CVSA)
Capital Asset Group
Caribbean Student Network (CSN)
CAS Peer Mentors
College Democrats
College Republicans (Suffolk GOP)
Collegiate Investors Association (CIA)
Commuter Students Association (CSA)
Dance Company
Eco Ambassadors
Economics Club
Entrepreneurship Club
Environmental Club
Fashion Industry Network
Future Investors in Real Estate (F.I.R.E.)
Graduate Student Association (GSA)
Health Careers Club
Hellenic Association (HA)
Hillel
Hispanic Association (SUHA)
History Society
In House Design
Information Systems (IS Club)

International Business Club (IBC)
International Student Association (ISA)
Italian-American Student Union (IASU)
Jazz Ensemble
Knitting Club
Latinos on the Move (LOTM)
Mirembe On My Mind
Model United Nations (MUN)
Musilim Student Association
National Association of Black Accountants (NABA)
Paintball Club
Paralegal Association
Paranormal Club (Paranormal)
Performing Arts Office (PAO)
Philosophy Society
Pre Law Association
Professional Marketing Association (PMA)
Program Council (PC)
Project Nur
Psychology Club
Rainbow Alliance
Ready, Set, Act! Children's Theater
Residence Hall Association (RHA)
Russian Speakers Association
Seriously Bent Improv Comedy Troup (Seriously Bent)
SGA- Finance Committee (FinCom)
Sigma Alpha Epsilon (SAE)
Sigma Gamma Rho (SGR)

Ski and Snowboard Club
South Asian Student Association
Step Team
Student Government Association (SGA)
Student Judicial Review Board (SJRB)
Student Leadership and Involvement (SLI)
Student Political Science Association
Suffolk Bikes
Suffolk Free Radio
Suffolk Smile Train (Smile Train)
Suffolk Snidgets: Suffolk University's Quidditch Team (Quidditch)
Suffolk University Book Club (Booklub)
Suffolk University Coalition of Reason (SUCOR)
Suffolk University Mathematics Society (SUMS)
Suffolk University Mock Trial (SUMTT)
SUNORML (The National Organization for the Reform of Marijuana Laws)
Techies Union
The French Club
The Journey Leadership Program (The Journey)
The Photo Club
The Ramifications A Capella Group (The Ramifications)
The Suffolk Journal (The Journal)
The Suffolk Voice (The Voice)
Theta Phi Alpha
Who's Askin'? Sketch Comedy Troupe (Who's Askin'?)

Image gallery

See also
Suffolk University
Suffolk University Law School
Sawyer Business School
List of Suffolk University people

References

External links and references
Official SUCAS website

Educational institutions established in 1934
Suffolk University
1934 establishments in Massachusetts
Liberal arts colleges at universities in the United States